Kingsbarns railway station served the village of Kingsbarns, Fife, Scotland from 1883 to 1930 on the Fife Coast Railway.

History 
The station opened on 1 September 1883 by the Anstruther and St Andrews Railway. It closed to both passengers and goods traffic on 22 September 1930, although it was occasionally used during the Second World War for RAF Kilduncan personnel.

References 

Disused railway stations in Fife
Former North British Railway stations
Railway stations in Great Britain opened in 1883
Railway stations in Great Britain closed in 1930
1883 establishments in Scotland
1930 disestablishments in Scotland